Thawi Watthana Samut Sakhon United Football Club (Thai: ทวีวัฒนา สมุทรสาคร ยูไนเต็ด) is a Thai association football club based in Samut Sakhon Province. The team plays their home matches at IPE Samut Sakhon Stadium. The club is currently playing in the Thai League 3 Western region.

Prior to 2016, the club was called "IPE Samut Sakhon FC". After it was promoted to the Regional League Division 2, the club changed its name to IPE Samut Sakhon United.

Crest history

Stadium and locations

Season by season record

Honours
Khǒr Royal Cup (ถ้วย ข.)
Winner : 2015

Team records
 First Official Match
 0–1 loss v Ramkhamhaeng University  (Ngor Royal Cup, 27 January 2009, Railway Club Field, Wachirabenchathat Park Bangkok)
 First League Match
 0–3 loss v Simork F.C. (19 March 2016, Suphanburi Sports School Stadium)
 First Thai League Cup Match
 0–3 loss v Assumption United F.C. (23 March 2016, SCG Stadium)
 First player to score a league goal
 Togbe Marcel (0–2 win v. Muangkan United F.C. 26 March 2016 Kanchanaburi Province Stadium)
 Biggest Win
 5–1 win v Navy Medical Department (Khor Royal Cup, 21 November 2014, National Football Center, Bangkok)
 Biggest Defeat
 10–0 loss v Muangkan United F.C. (Thai League 3, 25 October 2020)

Players

Current squad

References

External links
 

Association football clubs established in 2016
Football clubs in Thailand
Samut Sakhon province
2016 establishments in Thailand